Shane Zantuck (born 20 May 1955) is a former Australian rules footballer who played with Melbourne Football Club, North Melbourne Football Club and the South Melbourne Football Club in the Victorian Football League (VFL).

Zantuck made his name as a running winger, before reverting to a role in defence. He began his career at North, playing just five games from 1974 to 1976. He then moved to South Melbourne for four seasons (1977–1980), playing 56 games. But it was at Melbourne that he made a name for himself, playing 88 games between 1981 and 1986, before retiring. He is well known for a famous outburst in 1984 (Round 14) with Melbourne coach Ron Barassi.

He is the brother of SEN 1116 radio presenter Troy Zantuck and the father of AFL footballer Ty Zantuck.

References 

1955 births
Living people
Sydney Swans players
North Melbourne Football Club players
Melbourne Football Club players
Australian rules footballers from Victoria (Australia)
Jacana Football Club players